Ovenstadlia is a village in Lier municipality, Norway. Located just north of the village Kjenner, it is a part of the urban area Kjenner, which has a population of 1,574.

References

Villages in Buskerud